Izza Ignacio is an actress in the Philippines.

In 1995, Ignacio was discovered and managed by FLT Films producer Rose Flaminiano. Her first launching movie was in Kara Kaakit-Akit (1996). She starred in sexy movies such as Dalaga Na Si Sabel (1997) with Roy Rodrigo, Hamog Sa Magdamag (1998) with Renzo Cruz, and Virgin Wife (2001) with Tonton Gutierrez.

She was included in the cast of TV sitcom Kaya ni Mister, Kaya ni Misis (1997-2001) starring Maricel Soriano and Cesar Montano, aired in ABS-CBN. She also appeared in the TV series Darating ang Umaga (2003) with Eula Valdez and Vina Morales, and Kung Fu Kids (2008).

Filmography
Kung Fu Kids (TV series) (2007) - Jairus Aquino, Eliza Pineda
Maging Sino Ka Man (TV series) (2006) - John Lloyd Cruz, Bea Alonzo, Anne Curtis, Sam Milby
Pilipinas, Game Ka Na Ba? (TV show) (2006) - Kris Aquino
Darating ang Umaga (TV series) (2003) - Vina Morales, Jodi Sta. Maria
Walang Iba Kundi Ikaw (2002) - Mikey Macapagal Arroyo, Geneva Cruz, Roi Vinzon
Walang Iwanan... Peksman! (2002) - Jinggoy Estrada, Judy Ann Santos
Mary D'Potter (TV sitcom) (2001) - Maricel Soriano
Virgin Wife (2001) - Piel Morena, Julio Diaz, Leandro Baldemor
Tabi Tabi Po! (2001) - Wowie De Guzman
Madame X (2000) - Ina Raymundo, Gary Estrada
Star Dancer (1998)
Hamog Sa Magdamag (1998) - Renzo Cruz, Piel Morena
Kaya ni Mister, Kaya ni Misis (TV sitcom) (1997-2001) - Maricel Soriano, Cesar Montano
Dalaga Na Si Sabel (1997) - Ramona Revilla, Roy Rodrigo
Sa Iyo Ang Itaas, Sa Akin Ang Ibaba... Ng Bahay (1997) - Rita Magdalena, Roy Rodrigo
Santo-Santito (1996) - Michael Rivero
Kara, Kaakit-Akit (1996) - Raymond Bagatsing

References

External links
Izza Ignacio tripod

Living people
Filipino film actresses
Year of birth missing (living people)
Filipino television actresses